Acropimpla is a genus of ichneumon wasps in the family Ichneumonidae. There are at least 40 described species in Acropimpla.

Species
These 41 species belong to the genus Acropimpla:

 Acropimpla alboricta (Cresson, 1870) c g b
 Acropimpla alboscutellaris (Szépligeti, 1908) c
 Acropimpla arjuna Gupta & Tikar, 1976 c g
 Acropimpla aspera Gupta & Tikar, 1976 c g
 Acropimpla benguetica Baltazar, 1961 c g
 Acropimpla bicarinata (Cameron, 1899) c g
 Acropimpla bifida Gupta & Tikar, 1976 c g
 Acropimpla buddha Gupta & Tikar, 1976 c g
 Acropimpla calva Baltazar, 1961 c g
 Acropimpla davaonica Baltazar, 1961 c g
 Acropimpla devia Baltazar, 1961 c g
 Acropimpla didyma (Gravenhorst, 1829) c g
 Acropimpla emmiltosa Kusigemati, 1985 c g
 Acropimpla faciata Gupta & Tikar, 1976 c g
 Acropimpla facinotata Baltazar, 1961 c g
 Acropimpla flavoscutis (Cameron, 1907) c g
 Acropimpla hapaliae (Rao, 1953) c
 Acropimpla laevituberculata Liu, He & Chen g
 Acropimpla lampei g
 Acropimpla leucostoma (Cameron, 1907) c g
 Acropimpla lucifugus (Seyrig, 1932) c g
 Acropimpla maculifacia Gupta & Tikar, 1976 c g
 Acropimpla medioflava Baltazar, 1961 c g
 Acropimpla melanoplax Baltazar, 1961 c g
 Acropimpla mucronis g
 Acropimpla nakula Gupta & Tikar, 1976 c g
 Acropimpla nigrescens (Cushman, 1933) c g
 Acropimpla nigroscutis (Cameron, 1907) c g
 Acropimpla persimilis (Ashmead, 1906) c g
 Acropimpla phongdienensis g
 Acropimpla pictipes (Gravenhorst, 1829) c g
 Acropimpla poorva Gupta & Tikar, 1976 c g
 Acropimpla pronexus Townes, 1960 c g
 Acropimpla punctata Baltazar, 1961 c g
 Acropimpla spicula Gupta & Tikar, 1976 c g
 Acropimpla taishunensis Liu, He & Chen g
 Acropimpla tricolor Kusigemati, 1985 c g
 Acropimpla uchidai (Cushman, 1933) c g
 Acropimpla uttara Gupta & Tikar, 1976 c g
 Acropimpla varuna Gupta & Tikar, 1976 c g
 Acropimpla xantha Gauld, 1984 c g

Data sources: i = ITIS, c = Catalogue of Life, g = GBIF, b = Bugguide.net

References

Further reading

External links

 

Pimplinae